The Positions is the debut studio album by Australian alternative rock band Gang of Youths, released on 17 April 2015. The album debuted at number five on the ARIA Albums Chart and was preceded by three singles including "Magnolia", which has been described as the band's "breakthrough hit".

The album debuted was nominated for multiple ARIA Awards including Breakthrough Artist, Best Rock Album and Best Cover Art. At the J Awards of 2015, the album was nominated for Australian Album of the Year.

Upon release of the album, frontman Dave Le'aupepe said "I was in a four-year relationship with a girl who had a terminal illness and then I made a concept album about it with my friends."

Critical reception

Rod Yates of Rolling Stone Australia said the "record so emotionally bruised and honest that it at times feels like you're listening in on a conversation between frontman Dave Leaupepe and the girl in question" adding "the album oscillates between Kings of Leon style grandeur, Bruce Springsteen-esque storytelling and sounding like it could fall apart at any second – which, emotionally, is fitting." Roshan Clerke of The Music AU praised the album's "concrete vision" and said "...Leaupepe writes some of the most empowering sentiments to be found in modern rock music."

Track listing
All tracks are written by David Le'aupepe.

Standard edition "Vital Signs" – 7:23
 "Poison Drum" – 6:26
 "The Diving Bell" – 4:53
 "Restraint & Release" – 4:41
 "Magnolia" – 5:11
 "Kansas" – 4:08
 "Knuckles White Dry" – 6:10
 "Radioface" – 6:52
 "Sjamboksa"  – 7:12
 "The Overpass" – 7:29Bonus disc - Juices..... B-sides & Demos

 "Strange Diseases" (Early Demo) – 7:23
 "Evangelists" – 6:26
 "A Sudden Light" (Early Demo) – 4:53
 "Benevolence Riots" – 4:41
 "Lover In My Lungs" – 5:11

Personnel
Adapted from the album's liner notes.

Musicians
Gang of Youths
 David Le'aupepe – writing, vocals , guitar , percussion , keyboard , piano , strings 
 Sam O'Donnell – drums , percussion , vocals 
 Jung Kim – guitar , keyboard , percussion , vocals , strings 
 Max Dunn – bass guitar , percussion , vocals , strings 
 Donnie Borzestowski – drums 
 Joji Malani – guitar  keyboard , percussion , vocals , strings 

Other musicians
 Jane Scarpantoni – strings, cello  
 James Felice – piano 
 Kevin McMahon – guitar , percussion , keyboard 
 Stella McMahon – percussion 
 Chris Collins – percussion 
 Joel van Gastel – drums 
 Jamal Ruhe – guitar 
 Edward M. Mackenzie – spoken vocals 
 Benjamin Reisemann-Jeffrey – horns

Technical
 Greg Calbi – mastering 
 Kevin McMahon – producing , engineering , mixing 
 Peter Holz – engineering 
 Adrian Breakspear – engineering 
 Christina Thiers – engineering 
 Peter Katis – mixing 
 Chris Collins – producing, engineering , mixing 
 Gang of Youths – producing 
 Donnie Borzestowski – engineering 
 Jung Kim – engineering 
 David Le'aupepe – engineering 
 Joji Malani – engineering 
 Nora Wever – engineering 
 Karl Cashwell – engineering , mixing 
 David J. Andrew – engineering

Artwork
 Rachela Nardella – photography
 Callum van de Mortel – photography
 Nathan Johnson – artwork design

Charts

Certifications

Release history

References

2015 debut albums
Gang of Youths albums
Albums produced by Gang of Youths
Albums produced by Kevin McMahon (musician)
Sony Music Australia albums